Conrid Clyde Berry (born 1931) is a former American football and baseball player and coach.
He was the head football coach at Henderson State College—now known as Henderson State University—in Arkadelphia, Arkansas from 1967 to 1970, compiling a record of 26–14. Berry also served two stints as head baseball coach at Henderson State, from 1963 to 1966 and from 1982 to 1987, tallying a mark of 205–129–2.

Berry was the nephew of Major League Baseball pitcher Joe Berry.

Head coaching record

Football

References

External links
 Henderson State Hall of Fame profile
 

1931 births
Living people
Henderson State Reddies baseball coaches
Henderson State Reddies baseball players
Henderson State Reddies football coaches
Henderson State Reddies football players
Madisonville Miners players
Topeka Owls players